Goldsberry is a surname. Notable people with the surname include:

Gordon Goldsberry (1927–1996), American baseball player, scout and executive
John Goldsberry (born 1982), American basketball player
Kirk Goldsberry (born 1977), basketball writer and former basketball executive
Renée Elise Goldsberry (born 1971), American actress, singer and songwriter